Maritta Bauerschmidt (later Grießig, born 23 March 1950) is a retired German artistic gymnast. She competed at the 1968 Summer Olympics and won a bronze medal with the East German team. Her best individual achievement was eighth place on the balance beam.

After 1970 she also competed nationally in rhythmic gymnastics. A trained chemist she had a second degree in physical education from the Deutsche Hochschule für Körperkultur, and worked as a coach first in Budapest and then in Berlin.

References

1950 births
Living people
People from Waldheim, Saxony
German female artistic gymnasts
Olympic gymnasts of East Germany
Gymnasts at the 1968 Summer Olympics
Olympic bronze medalists for East Germany
Olympic medalists in gymnastics
Medalists at the 1968 Summer Olympics
Sportspeople from Saxony
20th-century German women
21st-century German women